The Nigerian Communist Party (NCP) was a communist party in Nigeria. The NCP was banned by Decree 34 of the regime of General Johnson Aguiyi-Ironsi in 1966.

References

Communist parties in Nigeria
Defunct political parties in Nigeria
Communism in Nigeria
Banned communist parties